The 2005 China Open was an ATP International Series and WTA Tour Tier II tennis tournament held in Beijing, China.

Finals

Men's singles

 Rafael Nadal defeated  Guillermo Coria, 5–7, 6–1, 6–2

Women's singles

 Maria Kirilenko defeated  Anna-Lena Grönefeld, 6–3, 6–4

Men's doubles

 Justin Gimelstob /  Nathan Healey defeated  Dmitry Tursunov /  Mikhail Youzhny, 4–6, 6–3, 6–2

Women's doubles

 Nuria Llagostera Vives /  María Vento-Kabchi defeated  Yan Zi /  Zheng Jie, 6–2, 6–4

2005 ATP Tour
2005 WTA Tour
2005
2005 China Open (tennis)
2005 in Chinese tennis